Vodruž is a settlement in the Municipality of Šentjur, eastern Slovenia. It is dispersed in the valley of Kozarica Creek, in the hills south of the town of Šentjur. The settlement, and the entire municipality, are included in the Savinja Statistical Region, which is in the Slovenian portion of the historical Duchy of Styria.

References

External links
Vodruž at Geopedia

Populated places in the Municipality of Šentjur